is a Japanese footballer who plays for Kataller Toyama.

Club statistics
Updated to 2 January 2022.

References

External links

Profile at Oita Trinita

1998 births
Living people
Association football people from Ōita Prefecture
Japanese footballers
J1 League players
J2 League players
J3 League players
Oita Trinita players
Blaublitz Akita players
Fujieda MYFC players
Kataller Toyama players
Association football forwards